Kaat is a given name. Notable people with the name include:

Kaat Dumarey (born 1999), Belgian acrobatic gymnast
Kaat Hannes (born 1991), Belgian road cyclist
Kaat Tilley (1959–2012), Belgian fashion designer
Kaat Van Daele (born 1989), Belgian figure skater
Kaat Van der Meulen (born 1995), Belgian racing cyclist